Studies in the Labour Theory of Value (1956; second edition 1973) is a book about the labor theory of value by the economist Ronald L. Meek. The book has been praised by commentators.

Reception
A. W. Coats reviewed Studies in the Labour Theory of Value positively in Kyklos, writing that whether or not Meek was successful in his defense of the labor theory of value, he "certainly provided enough solid material to tax the ingenuity of students of Marxist economics." Studies in the Labour Theory of Value was praised by the historian G. E. M. de Ste. Croix in The Class Struggle in the Ancient Greek World (1982), and by the political scientist David McLellan in Karl Marx: His Life and Thought (1995).

References

Bibliography
Books

 
 

Journals

  

1956 non-fiction books
Books about Karl Marx
Books about labour
English-language books
Lawrence & Wishart books